Alastair Greenwood Hill (25 April 1934 – 18 December 2018) was a Scottish football player. He won the 1955 Scottish Cup with Clyde.

Hill died in Blairgowrie on 18 December 2018, at the age of 84.

References 

Sources

1934 births
2018 deaths
Scottish footballers
Clyde F.C. players
Dundee F.C. players
Bristol City F.C. players
Stirling Albion F.C. players
Falkirk F.C. players
Scottish Football League players
English Football League players
Association football wingers
Footballers from Glasgow
Scotland under-23 international footballers
Jeanfield Swifts F.C. players